Carbonate hardness, is a measure of the water hardness caused by the presence of carbonate and bicarbonate anions. One dKH is equal to 17.848 mg/L (ppm) , e.g. one dKH corresponds to the carbonate and bicarbonate ions found in a solution of approximately 17.848 milligrams of calcium carbonate() per litre of water (17.848 ppm). Both measurements (mg/L or KH) are usually expressed as mg/L  – meaning the concentration of carbonate expressed as if calcium carbonate were the sole source of carbonate ions.

An aqueous solution containing 120 mg NaHCO3 (baking soda) per litre of water will contain 1.4285 mmol/l of bicarbonate, since the molar mass of baking soda is 84.007 g/mol. This is equivalent in carbonate hardness to a solution containing 0.71423 mmol/L of (calcium) carbonate, or 71.485 mg/L of calcium carbonate (molar mass 100.09 g/mol). Since one degree KH = 17.848 mg/L CaCO3, this solution has a KH of 4.0052 degrees.

Carbonate hardness should not be confused with a similar measure Carbonate Alkalinity which is expressed in either [milli[equivalent]s] per litre (meq/L) or ppm. Carbonate hardness expressed in ppm does not necessarily equal carbonate alkalinity expressed in ppm.

 
whereas

However, for water with a pH below 8.5, the CO32− will be less than 1% of the HCO3− so carbonate alkalinity will equal carbonate hardness to within an error of less than 1%.

In a solution where only CO2 affects the pH, carbonate hardness can be used to calculate the concentration of dissolved CO2 in the solution with the formula CO2 = 3 × KH × 10(7-pH), where KH is degrees of carbonate hardness and CO2 is given in ppm by weight.

The term carbonate hardness is also sometimes used as a synonym for temporary hardness, in which case it refers to that portion of hard water that can be removed by processes such as boiling or lime softening, and then separation of water from the resulting precipitate.

See also 

dGH or DGH or Degree of General Hardness, a measure of the hardness of water 
Hard water

References

External links
 Water Hardness definitions

Carbonates